Taniela Evo Waqa (born June 22, 1983) is a Fijian association football defender playing for Fiji national football team and Labasa FC in the Fijian National Football League. He also participated in the 2007 South Pacific Games football tournament.

Achievements
 2015 Fiji Football Association Cup Tournament Player of the Tournament

External links
 

Living people
1983 births
Fijian footballers
Fiji international footballers
Labasa F.C. players
Hekari United players
Fijian expatriate sportspeople in Papua New Guinea
Expatriate footballers in Papua New Guinea
Association football defenders
I-Taukei Fijian people
Lautoka F.C. players
2004 OFC Nations Cup players
2008 OFC Nations Cup players
2012 OFC Nations Cup players